James Guy Parrack (born 10 March 1967, Cheltenham, England) is a male English sports journalist and former competitive swimmer.

Swimming career
As a breaststroke swimmer, he represented Great Britain at the 1988 Olympic Games on Seoul. He represented England a silver medal in the 100 metres breaststroke, at the 1990 Commonwealth Games in Auckland, New Zealand. Four years later he represented England again at the 1994 Commonwealth Games in the 100 metres breaststroke event.

He was also four times ASA British national champion in the 100 metres breaststroke (1988, 1994, 1995)  and 50 metres breaststroke (1995).

Journalism
Parrack currently commentates on swimming for the Eurosport television channel with Drew Gordon. He has also written for The Independent newspaper and various swimming magazines.

See also
 List of Commonwealth Games medallists in swimming (men)

References

External links 
Profile of James Parrack from 1990

1967 births
Living people
Commonwealth Games silver medallists for England
English male swimmers
Olympic swimmers of Great Britain
Sportspeople from Cheltenham
Swimmers at the 1988 Summer Olympics
Commonwealth Games medallists in swimming
Swimmers at the 1990 Commonwealth Games
Swimmers at the 1994 Commonwealth Games
Medallists at the 1990 Commonwealth Games